Ramus Pomifer (Latin for apple branch) was a constellation between Hercules and Lyra.

It was depicted in the form of a branch held in Hercules' left hand. The also obsolete constellation of Cerberus - made up of much the same stars - became combined with it in later depictions, with the name "Cerberus et Ramus".

References

Former constellations